JPEGmini is a Photo Optimization software product created in 2011. It is used to compress the file size of JPEG photos by approximately a factor of two to three, sometimes more, with minimal or imperceptible degradation in image quality.

Technology
JPEG-mini technology has two main components: The first is an image quality detector, which imitates the perceptual qualities of the human visual system, to determine the maximum amount of compression which can be applied to each individual photo without causing visible artifacts. The second is a JPEG encoder, which adapts the JPEG encoding process to the original photos, creating the compact representation of the photos that is possible under the JPEG standard. 

Combining these two components enables JPEG-mini to achieve an extremely high recompression ratio of up to 5x, or 80% reduction on digital photos, depending on their resolution.

JPEGmini uses proprietary technology.

See also
 Image compression
 JPEG
 Compression artifact
 JPEG (disambiguation)

References

External links
Official Website

JPEG
Graphics file formats
IEC standards
ISO standards
Image compression
Software companies of Israel
Companies based in Tel Aviv